Best of Both Worlds  is a two-disc compilation album by British neo-progressive rock band Marillion released in 1997 by EMI Records, who the band had been signed to from their debut in 1982 until being dropped in 1995. The title refers to Marillion's two distinct "eras" with lead singers Fish (1980—1988) and Steve Hogarth (since 1989). By the time this compilation was released, both line-ups had recorded four studio albums each. The second best-of since the 14-track one-disc compilation A Singles Collection (known as Six of One, Half a Dozen of the Other in the US) from 1992, this one additionally contains material from Brave (1994) and Afraid of Sunlight (1996). Two different covers were created for the compilation, one by Mark Wilkinson, who had worked for the band during the Fish years, and one by Bill Smith Studio, who took over after Fish's and Wilkinson's departure. The booklet was printed so that either of the covers could be displayed in the jewel case according to personal preference. The track list, comprising 29 songs, was put together by Lucy Jordache, then the manager responsible for the band in EMI, in close collaboration with the band's fans' mailing list, "Freaks" (named after the eponymous song). Jordache also motivated singers Fish and Hogarth to contribute liner notes—at a time when both camps were not yet on friendly terms again—by telling each of them the other had already agreed to do so.

Although the compilation did not contain any previously unreleased material, it was attractive to existing fans as it included various edited versions that were not easily accessible at the time, resulting in "better than expected" sales.

Track listing

Disc one
 "Script for a Jester's Tear" from Script for a Jester's Tear
 "Market Square Heroes" (B'Sides version) Non-album single
 "He Knows You Know" from Script for a Jester's Tear
 "Forgotten Sons" from Script for a Jester's Tear
 "Garden Party" from Script for a Jester's Tear
 "Assassing" (Single version) from Fugazi
 "Punch and Judy" from Fugazi
 "Kayleigh" (Single version) from Misplaced Childhood
 "Lavender" (Single version) from Misplaced Childhood
 "Heart of Lothian" (Single version) from Misplaced Childhood
 "Incommunicado" from Clutching at Straws
 "Warm Wet Circles" (Single version) from Clutching at Straws
 "That Time of the Night (The Short Straw)" from Clutching at Straws
 "Sugar Mice" from Clutching at Straws

Disc two
 "The Uninvited Guest" from Seasons End
 "Easter" from Seasons End
 "Hooks in You" (Meaty Mix) from Seasons End
 "The Space" from Seasons End
 "Cover My Eyes" from Holidays in Eden
 "No One Can" from Holidays in Eden
 "Dry Land" from Holidays in Eden
 "Waiting To Happen" from Holidays in Eden
 "The Great Escape" from Brave
 "Alone Again in the Lap of Luxury" (Radio Edit) from Brave
 "Made Again" from Brave
 "King" from Afraid of Sunlight
 "Afraid of Sunlight" from Afraid of Sunlight
 "Beautiful" (Radio Edit) from Afraid of Sunlight
 "Cannibal Surf Babe" from Afraid of Sunlight

Although it is not mentioned in the album credits, the versions of "Easter" and "The Uninvited Guest" presented here are single edits. "Waiting To Happen" is a few seconds shorter than the album version. "Cannibal Surf Babe" is presented without the musical bridge that appears at the end of the song on the album version.

Personnel

Steve Rothery – guitars
Mark Kelly – keyboards
Pete Trewavas – bass
Ian Mosley – drums, percussion (except CD 1, tracks 1–5)
Fish – vocals (CD 1)
Steve Hogarth – vocals and keyboards (CD 2)
Mick Pointer – drums, percussion (CD 1, tracks 1, 3–5)
John Marter – drums, percussion (CD 1, track 2)

References

1998 greatest hits albums
Marillion compilation albums